HD 20868 is a star in the southern constellation Fornax. With an apparent visual magnitude of 9.92, it is much too dim to be visible to the naked eye. Parallax measurements give a distance estimate of 156 light years from the Sun. It is drifting further away with a radial velocity of +46.2 km/s, having come to within about  around 312,000 years ago.

This object is a K-type star with a stellar classification of K3/4 III/V. It is around eight billion years old with 76% of the mass of the Sun and 73% of the Sun's radius. It is radiating 25.5% of the luminosity of the Sun from its photosphere at an effective temperature of 4,811 K. The metallicity of the star is near solar, meaning it has about the same abundance of iron as in the Sun.

The star HD 20868 is named Intan. The name was selected in the NameExoWorlds campaign by Malaysia, during the 100th anniversary of the IAU. Intan means diamond in the Malay language.

Planetary system 
In October 2008 a planet, HD 20868 b, was discovered. This object was detected using the radial velocity method by search programs conducted using the HARPS spectrograph. The orbital solution indicates this is a giant planet in a highly elliptical orbit around the host star.

See also 
 List of extrasolar planets

References

External links 
 

K-type subgiants
Planetary systems with one confirmed planet
Fornax (constellation)
Durchmusterung objects
020868
015578